Hullinger is a surname. Notable people with the surname include:

Arlo Hullinger (1921–2021), American politician
Jeff Hullinger, American television and radio personality